AutoTempest is an aggregator of online classified advertisements specifically for cars, that searches craigslist, eBay Motors, AutoTrader.com, Cars.com, Auto Trader (Canada), and others.

Created in 2007, AutoTempest started out as Hank's Helper, an offshoot of SearchTempest (Craig's Helper at the time) as a way of providing a specialized experience for all the used car shoppers visiting SearchTempest. Eventually the name was changed to AutoTempest and received a major redesign in 2011 that has led to a steady increase in popularity.

AutoTempest has been featured on a number of well known sites, being touted as the best way to find used cars online. Car blogging giant Jalopnik named AutoTempest the best way to find used cars online, and AutoTempest has also been featured on popular sites like WiseBread, The Hooniverse and About.com's guide to used cars.

References

Online advertising services and affiliate networks
Marketing companies established in 2007